The "State Anthem of the Union of Soviet Socialist Republics" was the national anthem of the Soviet Union and the regional anthem of the Russian Soviet Federative Socialist Republic from 1944 to 1991, replacing "The Internationale". Its original lyrics were written by Sergey Mikhalkov (1913–2009) in collaboration with Gabriyel’ Arkadyevich Ureklyan (1899–1945), and its music was composed by Alexander Alexandrov (1883–1946). For a two-decade interval following de-Stalinization, the anthem was performed without lyrics. The second set of lyrics, also written by Mikhalkov and in which Stalin's name was omitted, was adopted in 1977.

A decade after the collapse of the Soviet Union, the music was adopted with new lyrics, again written by Mikhalkov, as the Russian national anthem.

History

Origins 
The anthem's music was originally composed by Alexander Alexandrov in 1938 for the Hymn of the Bolshevik Party. Its opening bars were borrowed from one of Alexandrov's previous pieces, "Life has become better", which was based on a quote by former Soviet Union General Secretary Joseph Stalin at the First All-Union Meeting of the Stakhanovites on 17 November 1935. The song alludes to Stalin's cult of personality.

Other than "Life Has Become Better", the music of the anthem has several possible outside influences. Alexandrov himself has described it as the combination of a march with Russian traditional music, particularly that of bylina epic songs. The anthem shares several chord progressions with Vasily Kalinnikov's overture Bylina, Epic Poem (which, as its name indicates, is also inspired by the bylina tradition). There also exist similarities between Alexandrov's anthem and Robert Schumann's Frühlingsfahrt.

When the Communist International (Comintern) was dissolved in 1943 for the Soviet Union to maintain its alliance with the other Allies of World War II, a new composition was needed to replace "The Internationale" as the national anthem. A contest was held in mid to late 1943 for a new anthem, and more than 200 entries were submitted. Alexandrov's music was personally chosen by Stalin, who both praised and criticized it. The anthem's lyrics then had to be written. Stalin thought the song should be short, and that it should invoke the Red Army's impending victory over the forces of Germany on the Eastern Front. The poets Sergey Mikhalkov and Gabriyel’ Arkadyevich Ureklyan were chosen by Stalin's staffers, called to Moscow, and given the task of writing lyrics that referenced not only the Great Patriotic War, but also "a Country of Soviets". The first draft was completed overnight.

The anthem was first published on 7 November 1943. It was played for the first time on Soviet radio at midnight on 1 January 1944, and officially adopted on 15 March the same year. The new lyrics had three refrains following three different stanzas. In each refrain, the second line was modified to refer to friendship, then happiness, then glory. Joseph Stalin and the Soviet Union's war against Germany were originally invoked in the second and third verses, respectively. Reportedly, Stalin was opposed to including his name in the lyrics but relented after some Politburo members insisted.

Post-Stalin era 
With the process of de-Stalinization after Stalin's death, the lyrics referring to him were considered unacceptable, and from 1956 to 1977 the anthem was performed without lyrics. A notable exception took place at the 1976 Canada Cup ice hockey tournament, where singer Roger Doucet insisted on performing the anthem with lyrics after consultations with Russian studies scholars from Université de Montréal and Soviet team officials. In 1977, to coincide with the 60th anniversary of the October Revolution, revised lyrics, written in 1970 by original author Sergey Mikhalkov, were adopted. The varying refrains were replaced by a uniform refrain after all stanzas, and the line praising Stalin was dropped, as were the lines referring to the Great Patriotic War. Another notable change was the replacement of a line referring to the Soviet national flag with one citing the Communist Party of the Soviet Union in the form of "Partiya Lenina" (The party of Lenin). These lyrics were also present in the original party anthem at the same place in the melody, but followed by the lyrics "Partiya Stalina" (The party of Stalin).

Post-1991 use

Use in the Russian Federation
After the dissolution of the Soviet Union in 1991, the Russian Federation adopted a new anthem, the Patriotic Song. It was previously the regional anthem of the Russian Soviet Federative Socialist Republic from 1990 until 1991 (until 1990 it used the State Anthem of the Soviet Union). Unlike most national anthems, it had no official lyrics (although unofficial ones written for it were proposed, they were not adopted). 

The Patriotic Song was replaced soon after Vladimir Putin first took office on 7 May 2000. The federal legislature established and approved the music of the National Anthem of the Soviet Union, with newly written lyrics, in December 2000. Boris Yeltsin criticized Putin for supporting the semi-reintroduction of the Soviet-era national anthem, although some opinion polls showed that many Russians favored this decision. In late 2000, the current national anthem of Russia was introduced, which uses the music of the Soviet national anthem with new lyrics by Sergey Mikhalkov, who also wrote both the original Soviet anthem and its remake in 1977.

State Union of Russia and Belarus
The same music was used for a proposed anthem for the State Union of Russia and Belarus, entitled Derzhavny Soyuz Narodov ("Sovereign Union of Nations"). Its lyrics were not tied to any specific nationality, and there were official versions in the languages of every Soviet republic and several other Soviet languages; thus it could have been adopted by a broader union. However, it was never officially adopted, and there appear to be no plans to utilize it in any official role.

Decommunization 
In some post-Soviet states which adopted decommunization laws banning Communist symbolism, publicly performing the Soviet anthem is illegal. For example, since 2015, offenders in Ukraine face up to five years in prison. Similar laws were adopted in Latvia and Lithuania.

Communist symbols are also banned in Indonesia.

Similarly, some communist symbols (particularly Soviet symbols) are banned in Georgia, Germany and Poland.

Official translations 
The anthem has been officially translated into several languages:

Lyrics
This table shows the anthem's various lyrics. As there were two official lyric versions (in 1944 and 1977), both are included within their sections.

1944–1956 lyrics

1977–1991 lyrics

English versions

See also

 "God Save the Tsar!"
 "Grom pobedy, razdavajsya!" ("Let the thunder of victory rumble!")
 National anthem of Russia
 Patrioticheskaya Pesnya ("Patriotic Song")
 "The Internationale" in Russian
 "Worker's Marseillaise," Russian version of "La Marseillaise"
 National anthems of the Soviet Union and Union Republics
 Communist symbolism
 "Workers of the world, Unite!"

Notes

References

External links

 20 Most popular Soviet songs
 The author of Russian national anthem: sources of the USSR's anthem in Russian.
 by K.Kovalev – Eng. Bortniansky's anthem "Kol slaven" - Eng.
 

Songs about Russia
Songs about Joseph Stalin
1939 songs
Russian SFSR
Historical national anthems
National symbols of the Soviet Union
Soviet songs
Articles containing video clips
Russian anthems
National anthem compositions in C major
Symbols of communism